Bonita Pietila (born January 14, 1953) is a casting director and producer. She is best known for her work on The Simpsons, with which she has won three Emmy Awards (in 1998, 2000, and 2001). Pietila has been with the series since its beginnings on The Tracey Ullman Show in 1987. 
As well as working as line producer and producer on the series, she has undertaken other tasks involving The Simpsons including talent coordinator on the TV short Springfield's Most Wanted, voice director on the video game The Simpsons: Virtual Springfield and producer on the direct-to-video film The Simpsons Take the Bowl.

Pietila has also worked on several other films and TV shows other than The Simpsons such as The Texas Chainsaw Massacre 2, The Ben Stiller Show, CBS Summer Playhouse, Friends, Teen Angel, Hollywood Dog, Tough Guys Don't Dance, Notes from Underground, Housekeeping, Surrender and the 1999 TV film adaptation of Animal Farm.

Early life
Pietila was born and raised in the Upper Peninsula of Michigan. She is of Finnish descent; her grandparents had moved to the United States from Teuva, Finland.

References

External links

Living people
American television producers
American women television producers
American film producers
American casting directors
Women casting directors
American voice directors
Place of birth missing (living people)
Emmy Award winners
American people of Finnish descent
People from the Upper Peninsula of Michigan
1953 births